The Serbia women's national handball team is the national team of Serbia. It is governed by the Handball Federation of Serbia and takes part in international handball competitions.

Olympic Committee of Serbia declared women's national handball team as the best female team of the year in 2001 and 2013.

Results
The Serbian Handball Federation is deemed the direct successor to Yugoslavia and Serbia and Montenegro by EHF.

Summer Olympics

World Championship

European Championship

** Red border color indicates that tournament was held on home soil.

Mediterranean Games
 1993 – Suspended
 1997 – 4th
 2001 – 4th
 2005 –  Runners-up
 2009 – 5th
 2013 –  Champions
 2018 – 8th
 2022 –  3rd

Other tournaments
Carpathian Trophy
Carpathian Trophy 1999 – 5th place
Carpathian Trophy 2000 – 
Carpathian Trophy 2001 – 
Carpathian Trophy 2002 – 4th
Carpathian Trophy 2004 – 
Carpathian Trophy 2006 – 5th
Carpathian Trophy 2011 – 
Carpathian Trophy 2018 – 4th

Møbelringen Cup/Intersport Cup
Møbelringen Cup 2001 – 4th place
Møbelringen Cup 2010 – 
Møbelringen Cup 2014 – 4th

Team

Current squad
Squad for the 2022 European Women's Handball Championship.

Head coach:   Uroš Bregar

Famous players
Dragana Cvijić
Sanja Damnjanović
Kristina Liščević
Svetlana Kitić – 1988 IHF World Player of the Year
Bojana Radulović – 2000 and 2003 IHF World Player of the Year
Andrea Lekić – 2013 IHF World Player of the Year
Katarina Tomašević

Statistics

Most appearances

Top scorers

References

External links

IHF profile

National team
Handball
Women's national handball teams